Gedeo is a Highland East Cushitic language of the Afro-Asiatic family spoken in south central Ethiopia. Alternate names for the language include Derasa, Deresa, Darassa, Geddeo, Derasanya, Darasa.  It is spoken by the Gedeo people, who live in the highland area, southwest of Dila and east of Lake Abaya.

The languages has SOV word order.  Verbs are marked for person, number, and gender of subject.  Verbs are marked for voice: active, causative, middle, and passive.

The New Testament was published in the Gedeo language in 1986, using the Ethiopian syllabary.

References

Sources 
 Wedekind, Klaus. 1980. "Sidamo, Gedeo (Derasa), Burji: Phonological differences and likenesses," Journal of Ethiopian Studies 14: 131-76.
 Wedekind, Klaus. 1985. "Gedeo (Derasa) verb morphology and morphophonemics," The verb morphophonemics of five highland east Cushitic languages, including Burji.  Afrikanistische Arbeitspapiere 2. Cologne: Institut für Afrikanistik.  Pages 82–109.

External links 
 Introduction to Gedeo dictionary (archived)
 Gedeo dictionary (archived)

East Cushitic languages
Languages of Ethiopia